Anthocercis, commonly known as tailflower, is a genus of shrubs which are endemic to southern temperate Australia with the center of distribution in the South West Botanical Province of Western Australia. All species of Anthocercis contain tropane alkaloids, and have occasionally caused poisoning in children or been suspected of poisoning stock. Anthocercis is known as the only Solanaceous plant known to produce resin compounds on glandular trichomes.

Taxonomy
The genus, which is placed within the family Solanaceae, was first formally described by botanist Jacques Labillardière in Novae Hollandiae Plantarum Specimen, Vol. 2: 19 (1806). The type species of the genus is Anthocercis littorea Labill.

Anthocercis lies in the subfamily Nicotianoideae. The genus is considered to be part of the tribe "Anthocercideae," but the monophyly of this grouping has been called into question. The species within Anthocercis, however, form a monophyletic group, and lie sister to all other genera of the "Anthocercidoid clade.".

Etymology
Anthocercis; from the Greek anthos (a flower) and kerkis (a ray), in reference to the narrow corolla-lobes.

Species

 Anthocercis angustifolia F.Muell.
 Anthocercis anisantha Endl.
 Anthocercis aromatica C.A.Gardner
 Anthocercis fasciculata F.Muell.
 Anthocercis genistoides Miers
 Anthocercis gracilis Benth. — Slender tailflower
 Anthocercis ilicifolia Hook. — Red striped yellow tailflower
 Anthocercis intricata F.Muell.
 Anthocercis littorea Labill. — Yellow tailflower
 Anthocercis sylvicola T. D. Macfarl. & Ward.-Johnson
 Anthocercis viscosa R.Br. — Sticky tailflower

Hybrids
 Anthocercis tenuipes Gand. (putative hybrid between Duboisia myoporoides R.Br. & Cyphanthera scabrella (Benth.) Miers)

Renamed
 Anthocercis microphylla F.Muell. → Cyphanthera microphylla Miers — Small-leaved anthocercis
 Anthocercis odgersii F.Muell. → Cyphanthera odgersii F.Muell. — Woolly anthocercis
 Anthocercis racemosa F.Muell. → Cyphanthera racemosa (F. Muell.) Haegi

References

Notes

Bibliography

 , (1982): Flora of Australia. Volume 29: Solanaceae, pp. 6 – 13.
  (2003): Plant Resins, p. 95.
 , (1996):  Anthocercis sylvicola (Solanaceae), a rare new species from the tingle forests of Walpole, south western Australia, Nuytsia, Vol. 11, no.1, p. 71-78 : ill.

External links

 
 

Nicotianoideae
Solanaceae genera
Solanales of Australia
Eudicots of Western Australia